The New Mexico–New Mexico State football rivalry, known as the Battle of I-25 and the Rio Grande Rivalry in all sports, is an annual football game between the University of New Mexico and New Mexico State University. It is called the Battle of I-25 because the two universities are located along Interstate 25 connecting Albuquerque and Las Cruces. In the entire history of the rivalry, the game has never been contested anywhere beside those two cities.

Series history
The rivalry between New Mexico's only two NCAA Division I institutions dates back to January 1, 1894 – eighteen years before New Mexico achieved statehood – when the schools met in a football contest in Albuquerque. While it is clear that New Mexico won that first game, school records seem to disagree on the score. According to New Mexico media guides the final score was 25–5 but according to New Mexico State media guides the score was 18–6. By the time New Mexico entered the union in 1912 UNM and New Mexico A&M (as NMSU was known prior to 1959) had already met on the gridiron six times. Beginning in 1993, the two universities played for the Maloof Trophy, but it was short-lived; the trophy was retired in 2000. Until 1937, the series was competitive with the Aggies holding a 15–12–4 lead over the Lobos. Since 1938, the Lobos have dominated the series 55–16–1 except during 1959–1968 when the Aggies won 7 of 10 meetings. The Lobos all-time advantage is 73–33–5, however the rivalry remains spirited. Most recently the Aggies defeated the Lobos 21–9 on October 15, 2022. The September 26, 2009 game when the Aggies won 20–17 in Albuquerque was the 100th time the teams had played each other.

In August 2020, New Mexico State postponed football and fall sports due to COVID-19 with consideration for a spring football season. The Mountain West Conference initially postponed fall sports for New Mexico and other member schools as well, but New Mexico and other member schools began a conference-only schedule beginning in late October. The 2020 season was the first since 1945 without the rivalry game.

Game results

 Non-conference games (94: 1894–1930 and 1951–present)
 Not played in 17 seasons (1895–1904, 1907, 1910, 1918, 1943–1945 and 2020)

Coaching records

Since first game on January 1, 1894

New Mexico

New Mexico State

 John O. Miller's overall record in series was 2–0–0

See also
 List of NCAA college football rivalry games
 List of most-played college football series in NCAA Division I

References

1894 establishments in New Mexico Territory
College football rivalries in the United States
New Mexico Lobos football
New Mexico State Aggies football